Philip Wynter D.D. (1793–1871) was an English clergyman and academic.

Career
Wynter was the President of St John's College, Oxford, from 1828 to 1871, and the editor of the works of Joseph Hall.
While President at St John's College, he was also Vice-Chancellor of Oxford University from 1840 until 1844.

Family
Wynter married twice: firstly to Harriette Ann, the daughter of Capt. Henry Boyle Deane of Hurst Grove in Berkshire; secondly, to Diana Ann Taylor. He had a large family and his daughter by his second marriage, Harriette Ann, was the mother of the Liberal politician, Philip Morrell.

References

External links 

1793 births
1871 deaths
People educated at Merchant Taylors' School, Northwood
Presidents of St John's College, Oxford
Vice-Chancellors of the University of Oxford
19th-century English clergy